Filemon Vela and Filemon Bartolome Vela may refer to:

 Filemon Vela Sr. (Filemon Bartolome Vela, 1935–2004), the former federal judge appointed by Democratic President Jimmy Carter for the U.S. District Court for the Southern District of Texas
 Filemon Vela Jr. (Filemón Bartolomé Vela Jr., born 1963), son of the above, Democratic congressman for Texas's 34th congressional district